Tom Oliver Licence FSA, FRHistS, is a British historian specialising in the period 950–1200, with an additional interest in Victorian consumer waste. He is Professor of Medieval History and Consumer Culture at the University of East Anglia and director of the Centre of East Anglian Studies.

His work on Victorian consumer waste, represented in his book and website What the Victorians threw away, has attracted international press coverage.

Education
Licence attended Westcliff High School for Boys and has an MA in History (2002), MPhil in Medieval History (2003) and PhD (2006) from the University of Cambridge. His thesis title was "England's hermits, 970–1220".

He is a Fellow of the Royal Historical Society, the Society of Antiquaries and the Higher Education Academy.

Selected publications
Hermits and Recluses in English society, 950–1200 (2011,)
Herman the Archdeacon and Goscelin of Saint-Bertin: Miracles of St Edmund, ed. (2014), Clarendon Press 
 Bury St Edmonds and the Norman Conquest (2014, edited,)
What the Victorians Threw Away (2015,)
Edward the Confessor: Last of the Royal Blood (2020), Yale University Press,

References

External links

What the Victorians threw away: the book, the database, the project

Year of birth missing (living people)
Living people
People educated at Westcliff High School for Boys
Alumni of the University of Cambridge
Academics of the University of East Anglia
British medievalists
21st-century British historians